Yevhen Viktorovych Koshovyi (born 7 April 1983) is a Ukrainian showman, TV presenter, and comic actor. In the past, he was a member of the KVN team "Va-Bank" from Luhansk (2000–2005). Since 2005, he was the host of the show “Laugh Comic” and “Evening Neighbourhood”. Since 2019, he was the host of the TV program “League of Laughter”. Koshovyi is also known for being one of the closest friends of President Volodymyr Zelenskyy.

Early life
Yevhen Koshovyi was born in the family of a factory worker and a kindergarten teacher in Kivsharivka, Kharkiv Oblast Soviet Union (now Ukraine). In 1989, the family moved to Alchevsk in Luhansk Oblast. Koshovyi graduated from the Acting Faculty of Luhansk College of Culture. He graduated in absentia from the Director's Faculty of the Luhansk Institute of Culture and Arts. In addition, he studied at a music school to play the saxophone.

Career
Koshovyi is the only object of pranks and jokes in the cast of "Kvartal 95 Studio". The bald comedian-character came to the studio from the Luhansk team of KVN "Va-Bank". He is the co-host of the morning Sunday entertainment program "Ukraine, get up!" on the TV channel "Inter". Since 2012 he is the judge of the program “Laugh Comic”. Since 2017, he is a member of the jury of the "League of Laughter". In 2019, he became the host of the "League of Laughter", replacing Volodymyr Zelenskyy, who resigned after being elected president of Ukraine.

Family
Married since 2007, Yevhen's wife is a dancer of Olena Kolyadenko's ballet "Freedom". Together with his wife, he raises his daughters Varvara and Serafima.

Filmography
2006 — «Police Academy»
2007 — «A Very New Year Film/Night in the Museum» — Nostradamus
2008 — «Shoot, Immediately!» — administrator of the hotel
2009 — «Like Cossacks…» (musical, Yevhen)
2010 — «Love in the Big City 2» (gastarbeiter)
2011 — «Bayky Mytyaya» — Yevheniy, student
2011 — «Heavenly Families» — the dry one, zek
2011 — «Office Romance. Our Time» (Stepan, system administrator)
2012 — «Rzhevsky vs. Napoleon» (Levsha)
2012 — «That Same Carlson!» (teacher)
2012 — «8 First Dates» (taxi driver)
2014 — «Love in the Big City 3» — Nikolaichuk, private detective (works for detective agency "Shield and Sword")
2015 — «8 New Dates» — guest at the wedding
2015 — «Servant of the People» — Serhii Viktorovich Mukhin, minister of international affairs
2016 — «8 Best Dates» — «driver of the main hero»
2017 — «Servant of the People 2» — Serhii Viktorovich Mukhin, minister of international affairs
2018 — «Me. You. He. She» — Boris

References

1983 births
Living people
21st-century Ukrainian male actors
Ukrainian television presenters
People from Kharkiv Oblast